Blending is a technique to produce wine or other alcoholic beverages such as gueuze consisting in mixing different brews.

In the case of rosé wine production, it is one of the techniques used, consisting to mix a white wine with some red wine.

In the case with single-vintage, single-varietal wines, the grapes harvested may be from the same yield, but fermented from different batches.

See also 
 Blended whiskey

References 

Alcoholic drinks